Melissa Freeman (born April 1926) is a Bronx-born physician based at the Beth Israel Medical Center.

Education 
Freeman's grandfather was born a slave in the 1850s, and was a teenager when the Emancipation Proclamation was signed. Freeman grew up in Williamsburg, Brooklyn. She attended High School of Music & Art,  where she most enjoyed physiology and social work. She graduated Howard University College of Medicine in 1955, where she attended night classes and worked several day jobs. She was one of only 4 women in a class of 150 students.

Career 
Freeman completed an internship at Kings County Hospital Center and a residency at Nassau University Medical Center. She began practicing medicine in 1961. Working with Vincent Dole and Marie Nyswander, she developed the use of methadone to treat heroin addiction. She was one of the first doctors to treat women using methadone maintenance. She set up her own internal medicine practice in Harlem in 1981.

She has worked at Beth Israel Hospital for over 50 years. She runs a methadone maintenance program in New York, and mentors young doctors.

She inspired Valentin Bonilla Jr, Chief Physician Assistant at the Mount Sinai Beth Israel Opioid Treatment Program, to pursue a career in medication-assisted treatment.

Personal life 
Freeman is Catholic.

References 

American women physicians
African-American physicians
1926 births
Hunter College alumni
Howard University College of Medicine alumni
Internal medicine
People from the Bronx
Living people
People from Williamsburg, Brooklyn
The High School of Music & Art alumni
African-American Catholics
21st-century African-American people
21st-century African-American women
20th-century African-American people
20th-century African-American women